1,5-Hexadiene is the organic compound with the formula (CH)(CH=CH).  It is a colorless, volatile liquid.  It is used as a crosslinking agent and precursor to a variety of other compounds.

Synthesis
1,5-Hexadiene is produced commercially by the ethenolysis of 1,5-cyclooctadiene:  
(CHCH=CHCH)  +  2 CH=CH   →  2 (CH)CH=CH
The catalyst is derived from ReO on alumina.

A laboratory-scale preparation involves reductive coupling of allyl chloride using magnesium:
2 ClCHCH=CH  +  Mg  →   (CH)(CH=CH)  +  MgCl

References

Alkadienes
Monomers